Atlas of Our Changing Environment is a series of atlases published beginning in 2005 by the United Nations Environment Programme. The series includes:

 One Planet Many People: Atlas of Our Changing Environment (2005)
 Africa Lakes: Atlas of Our Changing Environment (2006)
 Africa: Atlas of Our Changing Environment (2008)

These publications primarily make use of historical and recent satellite data alongside maps and photos to highlight areas of environmental change around the globe.

References

External links 
 
 
 
 WorldCat

Atlases
Environmental non-fiction books
Environmental websites